The Evans Quartet is a barbershop quartet that won the 1960 SPEBSQSA international competition.

Discography
 Merry Christmas – Barbershop Style (1961; LP)
 The Evans Quartet (1964; LP)

References

Barbershop quartets
Barbershop Harmony Society